Maïté Mathieu (24 December 1928 in Fécamp (Seine-Maritime) - 16 February 2021) was a French leftist Catholic political activist and feminist.

References

French Catholics
French feminists
1928 births
2021 deaths
People from Fécamp